is the second major studio album by the indie rock band Jinn. It was released on February 6, 2008.

Track listing
 [4:52]
"Vuena Vista" [5:11]
"Route 18" [5:39]
 [5:08]
 [5:23]
 [6:14]
 [6:00]
 [5:09]
 [5:16]
 [4:57]
 [6:30]

Jinn (band) albums
2008 albums